Helsi Herlinda (born 19 March 1974) is an Indonesian television actress, model, executive producer and presenter. Herlinda was well known by public for her role as an antagonist in RCTI's popular show Bawang Merah Bawang Putih which aired in 2004 to 2005.

Career
She is known for roles in opera soap as antagonist role. In addition as soap opera, she also performers as commercial model and presenter in some channel television. This time, She also busy for preparing her first album. She ever starring the soap opera, like Bawang Merah Bawang Putih, Namaku Mentari, Taqwa, and Cinta Bunga 2. One of the protagonist role was played by herself entitled Tasbih Cinta as Juleha. On 2014, she starring in a drama musical film, Suka-Suka Super 7 & Idola Cilik: Habis Gelap Menuju Terang. In this film, she takes a protagonist role and stars with Coboy Junior's former member, Bastian Steel, Mike Lewis, and Denada.

In June 2014, when she met at Pasar Baru, Central Jakarta, she admitted that her want get awards as film-makers. She comments by saying: 
Previously, she also admitted her worry if her swerved to be protagonist role in the film. She comments by saying:

Controversy
Herlinda is an artist who often exposed cases of persecutors by people and fans due to her antagonist role. In June 2008, Herlinda has rumored to have been mistreated by her husband and causing bruises on her eyes. The rumour had denied by her and admitted that just an ordinary accident.

Personal life
Herlinda was born on March 19, 1974, in Jakarta. Herlinda is the third child of 7 siblings of H. Amril Adam (alm) and Asni Syam. Herlinda had married to a property businessman, Agung B. Susanto, and have birth two child.

Filmography

Film

Television

References

External links
 

1974 births
Living people
People from Jakarta
Indonesian television actresses
Indonesian film actresses
Indonesian television presenters
Indonesian female models
Indonesian women television presenters